Egill Reimers (July 18, 1878  – November 11, 1946) was a Norwegian architect. He also competed in the 1920 Summer Olympics.

Reimers was born in Bergen, Norway, to Bastiam Reimers (b. 1838) and Maren Johnsdatter (b. 1843).  (Birth and marriage records spell his name Egil.)  He married Signe de Lange on March 24, 1906 in Bergen.

He graduated as an architect at Technische Hochschule at Munich in 1902.  He started his own practice in Bergen during 1904.

Reimers was one of the most active architects in the Bergen during the first half of the 20th century. He was awarded the Houen Foundation Award in 1924 for his design of the State Archives in Bergen (Statsarkivet i Bergen).
 The Bergen District Court (Bergen Tinghuset) was designed in the style of  Neoclassical architecture during 1933  and is considered one of his main works.

His building designs include several for the University of Bergen: University Museum of Bergen  Cultural History Collection (De kulturhistoriske samlinger)  in 1927, Geophysics Institute (Geofysisk Institutt)  in 1928 and  Nuclear Physics Laboratory (Kjernefysisk laboratorium) which was completed in 1950.

Reimers was a crew member of the Norwegian boat Heira II, which won the gold medal at the 1920 Summer Olympics in Antwerp, Belgium. He competed in the 12 metre class (1919 rating).

References

1878 births
1946 deaths
Architects from Bergen
Technical University of Munich alumni
Sportspeople from Bergen
Neoclassical architects
Norwegian male sailors (sport)
Sailors at the 1920 Summer Olympics – 12 Metre
Olympic sailors of Norway
Olympic gold medalists for Norway
Olympic medalists in sailing
Medalists at the 1920 Summer Olympics